Berlin Township is one of the fourteen townships of Mahoning County, Ohio, United States.  The 2010 census found 2,122 people in the township.

Geography
Located in the western part of the county, it borders the following townships:
Milton Township - north
Jackson Township - northeast corner
Ellsworth Township - east
Goshen Township - southeast
Smith Township - southwest
Deerfield Township, Portage County - west
Palmyra Township, Portage County - northwest corner

No municipalities are located in Berlin Township.

Name and history
Berlin Township was organized in 1828. The township was named after Berlin, Germany, the ancestral home of a share of the first settlers.

Statewide, other Berlin Townships are located in Delaware, Erie, Holmes, and Knox counties.

Government
The township is governed by a three-member board of trustees, who are elected in November of odd-numbered years to a four-year term beginning on the following January 1. Two are elected in the year after the presidential election and one is elected in the year before it. There is also an elected township fiscal officer, who serves a four-year term beginning on April 1 of the year after the election, which is held in November of the year before the presidential election. Vacancies in the fiscal officership or on the board of trustees are filled by the remaining trustees.

Current trustees (December 2017):
Denny Furman
Jodi Kale
Jason Young

Transportation
The intersection of U.S. Route 224 and State Route 534, which lies about twenty miles southwest of Youngstown, Ohio, is located in central Berlin Township.

References

External links
County website

Townships in Mahoning County, Ohio
1828 establishments in Ohio
Populated places established in 1828
Townships in Ohio